Republican Party of Peru (Spanish: Partido Republicano del Perú), was a political party in Peru. It was founded by Pedro R. Samillán.

Defunct political parties in Peru
Political parties with year of disestablishment missing
Political parties with year of establishment missing